The AFL Broken Hill (formerly, Broken Hill Football League) is an Australian rules football competition based in the Broken Hill region of New South Wales, Australia.  Although located in the state of New South Wales the league is an affiliated member of the South Australian National Football League (SANFL). The Broken Hill Football League is in the Murray Mallee Barrier Zone in the South Australian Country Football Championships.

Current clubs

There was no premiership awarded in 1925, when Central Broken Hill did not take to the field for the second half of the Grand Final against West Broken Hill, claiming that the field umpire was not giving them a fair go.

The 2020 Season was called off due to the COVID-19 Pandemic, with 3 of the 4 clubs voting in favor of abandoning the season.

History
It might seem curious that Australian rules football should develop as the dominant football code in a mining city in the far west of New South Wales, a state more known for the dominance of rugby league. Broken Hill was established as a mining town and many of the early settlers were from either the Victorian goldfields, or the copper mines of Moonta and Kadina in South Australia, both of which were areas being keen participants in the early development of Australian rules football. This link to states with an Australian rules football culture was further enhanced with the later flow of workers to and from the gold mining Kalgoorlie-Coolgardie axis in Western Australia.

Indeed, the city of Broken Hill to this day conducts itself in many ways as a city aligned to South Australia, using the same time zone (Australian Central Standard Time), being in the (08) Western/central area code, and its local television station, Central GTS/BKN, covers Broken Hill and parts of South Australia.

Football matches were first played in Broken Hill in 1885 and an informal competition was under way by 1888 between Broken Hill, Silverton, and Silver and Blues. The League was formed in 1890 as the Barrier Ranges Football Association (changing to its current name in 1928). Early years of the Association reflected the historical roots of its settlers and the two dominant clubs were known as the 'Victorians' and the 'South Australians'. Other early clubs were Broken Hill, North Broken Hill, South Broken Hill and Hotham.

In 1900 the League followed the trend of many other Leagues around the country at that time, and restructured along district lines. The four clubs that competed in the restructured competition are the same four clubs that make up the current competition, although South Broken Hill was then known as Alma.

The city's close association with South Australia was reflected with many of the League's stars finding success in the South Australian National Football League (SANFL) in the early 20th century. Prominent identities included North Broken Hill's Dave Low, who went on to win the 1912 Magarey Medal with West Torrens Football Club, Jack Woollard, captain of Port Adelaide Football Club's 1910 Championship of Australia-winning team, and Algy Millhouse, who captain-coached Norwood Football Club in 1914. The 1922 Magarey Medallist Robert Barnes and Bruce McGregor, who won Medals in 1926–7, were stars at West Adelaide Football Club. Leading goalkicker, Jack Owens, topped the SANFL's goal kicking ladder on three occasions with Glenelg Football Club in the 1920s and 1930s.

The League itself was considered strong enough to compete with visiting teams from the SANFL, Victorian Football League (VFL) and West Australian Football League (WAFL), and was even invited to send delegates to the inaugural Australasian Football Conference in Melbourne, in November 1905.

In more recent times players from Broken Hill have managed to find their mark with the country's premier league, the Australian Football League (AFL), including Fremantle's Dean Solomon, Brent Staker of West Coast and Brisbane, Taylor Walker of Adelaide and Mitch Clisby of the Melbourne Football Club.

Premierships

List of premiers
The complete list of premiers teams is detailed below.

Current results
The last decade of The Broken Hill Football league has seen the North Broken Hill Football Club show dominance over the rest of the competition, winning six out of the last ten premierships, in 2004, 07, 08, and then the rare achievement of three in a row in the 2011, 2012 & 2013 seasons. South and Central have fared the next best, with South winning in 2005 & 2009, and the Central side winning in 2006 & 2010. The West Football Club has struggled and has not won the Premiership since the 1990 season, the longest premiership drought in the club's history.

2011 Ladder

2012 Ladder

2013 Ladder

2014 Ladder

2015 Ladder

2016 Ladder

Women's competition

The women's competition started in 2012, making it the oldest rural competition in the state.

2012 Ladder

2013 Ladder

2014 Ladder

2015 Ladder

2016 Ladder

Premiers
The complete list of premiers teams is detailed below.

See also
AFL NSW/ACT
Australian rules football in New South Wales
Outback Rugby League

Books
 Encyclopedia of South Australian country football clubs / compiled by Peter Lines. 
 South Australian country football digest / by Peter Lines

References

External links
 
 Football in the Silver City, a history of Broken Hill footy 
 Broken Hill Football Back on Top
 Engineers Give Grandstand All Clear

Sport in Broken Hill, New South Wales
Australian rules football competitions in New South Wales
Australian rules football competitions in South Australia
1888 establishments in Australia
Sports leagues established in 1888